Joanna Palani (born c. 1993) is a Danish woman of Kurdish background who fought for the Kurdish People's Defence Units (YPG) against ISIS, including as a sniper. Palani's family is originally from Iranian Kurdistan, and she was born in a refugee camp in Ramadi in Iraq during the first Gulf War. Her family subsequently got asylum in Denmark when she was still a child. In 2014, she dropped out of a political science degree to fight in the YPG in Northern Syria and Peshmerga forces in Iraq after the rise of ISIS. She first went to Rojava in Syria, where she fought alongside the YPG for six months, and then joined the Peshmerga for another six months.

She was taken into custody on her return to Denmark. Palani is frequently the target of vicious threats, both online and offline, since her return to Denmark.

She has published an account of her experience: Freedom Fighter: My War Against ISIS on the Frontline of Syria.

References

Kurdish people
Women soldiers
People's Protection Units
Prisoners and detainees of Denmark
Military snipers
Living people

1990s births